Many mountains in Yosemite National Park are higher than ; three are higher than . The peaks of Yosemite are among some of the highest mountains in California. 

The below table gives information from peakbagger and summitpost. Some mountains are listed by one but not the other, and some elevations vary, as prominence varies; the clean prominence method is used in this table.

List

References

Mountains of Yosemite National Park
Mountains of Northern California
Yosemite National Park